The third HMS Dauntless was a wooden-hulled steam screw frigate, launched at Portsmouth in 1847.

History
First intended as a paddle vessel, she was designed by John Fincham, and partially redesigned to take screw propulsion; in an effort to improve her initially disappointing performance she was lengthened in 1850 at Portsmouth, but her 'paddler' lines did not entirely suit her for propeller drive and she never got the best out of her engines. Her armament consisted of eighteen 32-pounder guns on her main deck, four  shell guns and two 68-pounder carronades on her upper deck.

She first commissioned in August 1850 for service with the Experimental Squadron to trial in company with other ships of novel design or technology, then in the summer of 1852 Dauntless was assigned to the North America and West Indies Station. In November that year, while on passage from the Virgin Islands to Barbados, an outbreak of yellow fever killed ten of her crew, while a further 73 died of the disease in hospital at Barbados. There is a monument dedicated to these officers and men in the St. Matthias Anglican Church in Hastings, Barbados.

In 1854, with the start of the Crimean War Dauntless sailed with the Fleet to the Baltic, then in December transferred to the Black Sea taking with her artillery details and stores. In February 1855 her gunfire helped to beat back a Russian attack on Turkish army positions at Eupatoria and in April she was at the bombardment of Sevastopol, when one of her 68 pdr. guns burst, causing considerable damage to the ship, but somehow no casualties. Throughout the 1855 campaign on shore, the Dauntless provided officers and men for the Naval Brigade manning the batteries facing the landward defences of Sebastopol, and in October 1855 she made her final contribution to the naval campaign when she took part in the bombardment of Kinburn.

She remained with the Mediterranean Fleet until she returned home to pay off in 1857. She recommissioned in 1859 to become the Coastguard base ship at Southampton, then from 1864 transferred to the Humber on the same service. From 1870 she was reduced to the status of a tender to the Humber Coastguard ship HMS Wyvern until she was finally laid up at Devonport in 1878. She was sold for breaking on 1 May 1885.

Commanding officers

References
 
 Lyon, David and Winfield, Rif, The Sail and Steam Navy List: All the Ships of the Royal Navy 1815–1889, Chatham Publishing, London 2004. 
 The Times, Wednesday, 6 January 1847

Sloops of the Royal Navy
Ships built in Portsmouth
Crimean War naval ships of the United Kingdom
1847 ships